The Illyrian tombs in Boka-Përçeva constitute a cultural heritage monument in Përçeva, Klina, Kosovo.

The necropolis and tumuli are located only a few kilometers from the village of Gllarevë. Dating to the Late Bronze Age and the Early Iron Age, the complex includes nineteen tumuli, of which seven were excavated in the 1970s. Exploration of the site unearthed high-quality weapons, ornaments, and ceramic vessels for their time, evidence of active settlement by Illyrians in what would later be the Kingdom of Dardania.

Gallery

See also 
 Archaeology of Kosovo
 Kingdom of Dardania

References 

Archaeological sites in Kosovo
Klina
Bronze Age sites in Europe
Iron Age sites in Europe
Archaeology of Illyria
Illyrian Kosovo
Dardanians